Fleayi is the Latinized spelling of David Fleay's surname, and may refer to:

 David Fleay
 Fleay's Barred Frog (Mixophyes fleayi)
 Tasmanian Wedge-tailed Eagle (Aquala audax fleayii)